Bhimadeva may refer to:

 Bhima I, a king of the Chalukya (Solanki) dynasty of Gujarat
 Bhima II, a king of the Chalukya (Solanki) dynasty of Gujarat 
 Bhima of Mahikavati, a prince of the Yadava dynasty of Devagiri; established a new capital at Mahim in present-day Mumbai
 Bhima, a legendary hero of India